The term Bird goddess was coined by Marija Gimbutas with relation to figurines attributed to the neolithic Vinca culture. These figurines show female bodies combined with a bird's head. The interpretation as "goddess" is part of Gimbutas' program of feminist archaeology depicting the European neolithic as a "gynocentric" culture which would be ousted by the "patriarchal" Indo-European cultures with the onset of the Bronze Age.

Griffen (2005)  claims to have discovered a sign for the bird goddess in the Vinča signs.

Gimbutas also identified a "Lady of the Beasts" (the female analogon of Pashupati), a bear goddess and a snake goddess.

See also
Augur
Horus
Leda (mythology)
Language of the birds

Literature
Gimbutas, Marija and Campbell, Joseph, The Language of the Goddess, Thames & Hudson (2001) 

Goddesses
Legendary birds